This article contains the list of candidates associated with the 2018 Russian presidential election.

70 people – 46 independents and 24 party-nominated – informed the Central Election Commission (CEC)  that they intended to participate in the election as candidates. 1 January 2018 was the last day that independents could notify the CEC of their intent to participate. Independents had until the end of 7 January 2018 to file registration documents with the CEC, whilst for those nominated by parties the deadline was the end of 12 January. 36 people were nominated to participate in the election – 15 independents and 21 party-nominated candidates. Out of them, eight were registered, 11 withdrew, and 17 were rejected.

Candidates
These candidates have been officially registered by the CEC. Candidates are listed in the order they appeal on the ballot paper (alphabetical order in Russian).

Rejected candidates

Declared candidates who withdrew

Possible candidates who did not run
The following individuals were included in some polls, were referred to in the media as possible candidates or has publicly expressed interest long before the elections but never announced that they would run.

United Russia

Communist party

A Just Russia

Independent candidates

Candidates graphic timeline

See also
List of Russian presidential candidates

References 

 
2018